This is a list of notable alumni, faculty members, leaders and supporters of Dublin City University, Ireland:

Presidents
 Danny O'Hare, founding president, NIHE 1977–1989, DCU 1989-1999
 Ferdinand von Prondzynski, 2000-2010
 Brian MacCraith, 2010-2020
 Daire Keogh, 2020-

Notable faculty

 Pat Barker, Registrar and Professor 
 Patrick Brereton
 John Bruton, adjunct faculty, former Taoiseach
 Farrel Corcoran, retired Professor
 Michael Cronin, MRIA, later to TCD
 David Denby, retired
 Edward de Bono, adjunct faculty
 Robert Elgie, Professor, MRIA
 Diarmaid Ferriter, former member
 Barbara Freitag
 Marnie Holborow
 John Horgan, retired
 Brigitte Le Juez
 Colm Kearney, former member, deceased
 James Kelly, Professor
 Colum Kenny, Professor, journalist, barrister
 Peadar Kirby, former member
 Barbara O'Connor
 Roderic O'Gorman
 James O'Higgins Norman
 Donal O'Mathuna
 Eugene O'Riordan
 Derval O'Rourke
 Caoilfhionn Nic Pháidín, retired
 Paschal Preston
 Kevin Rafter
 Helena Sheehan, retired
 Alan Smeaton, Professor
 Malcolm Smyth
 Chris Stevenson, deceased
 Brian Trench
 Paul F. Whelan
 Jenny Williams
Keith Donohoe

Alumni

Media / Communications
 Rory Carroll, news correspondent, The Guardian newspaper
 Matt Cooper, presenter of The Last Word; Today FM; Sunday Times columnist 
 Noel Curran, former Director General of RTÉ
 Richard Curran, presenter of Dragon's Den; columnist for Sunday Independent
 Úna-Minh Caomhánach, journalist and writer
 Mark Little, founder of Storyful; former CEO of Ireland Twitter; e- US correspondent and presenter of Prime Time, RTÉ
 Tom Lyons, Deputy Editor, Sunday Business Post
 John Mulholland, Editor of  The Observer 
 Breda O'Brien, columnist (Mater Dei Institute)
 Kevin O'Sullivan, Editor of Irish Times
 Helen O'Rahilly, first woman Director of RTÉ Television; Creative Director, BBC Documentaries; Channel Executive, BBC One, BBC TV.
 Caitríona Perry, journalist and co-anchor for RTÉ
 Sean Whelan, Economics Editor, RTÉ

Arts
 Declan Buckley, television personality
 Marina Carr, author and playwright
 Finghin Collins, pianist
 John Connolly, author
 Neil Delamere, comedian
 Uaneen Fitzsimons, television presenter and DJ
 Breandán de Gallaí (Brendan Galway), Riverdance dancer
 Hazel Hayes, author, filmmaker, and YouTuber
 Stephen J. Martin, writer of contemporary comic fiction
 Patrick McCabe (SPD), novelist
 John McGahern (SPD)
 Caroline Morahan, RTÉ's Off the Rails, Fair City
 Barry Murphy, actor, comedian
  Ardal O'Hanlon, comedian, known for Father Ted
 Dearbhla Walsh, television director and Emmy Award winner
 Laura Whitmore, MTV UK presenter
 Don Wycherley (SPD)

Business
 John Hourican, banker, CEO of the Bank of Cyprus
 Albert Manifold, CEO of CRH plc
 Brody Sweeney, CEO and founder of O'Briens Irish Sandwich Bars
 Lorraine Twohill, Chief Marketing Officer of Google

Law, politics, and government
 Rotimi Adebari, Ireland's first black mayor, Portlaoise
 Clare Daly, TD, Dublin North 2016–2019, MEP 2019–
 Seán Dorgan, General Secretary of Fianna Fáil
 Brendan Howlin (SPD), Labour Party Teachta Dála
 Enda Kenny (SPD), Teachta Dála, Taoiseach from 2011 to 2017, Leader of Fine Gael from 2002 to 2017 
 Conor Lenihan, Fianna Fáil Teachta Dála; former Minister of State
 Mary Lou McDonald MEP, TD Teachta Dála, Deputy Leader of Sinn Féin since February 2009 
 Helen McEntee, TD, Fine Gael, Meath-East and Minister of State for Health - Older People
 Rónán Mullen, former Senator 
 Kathleen O'Meara, former Senator 
 Kathryn Reilly, former Sinn Féin Senator
 Noel Rock, former Fine Gael TD
 Brendan Ryan
 Duncan Smith, Labour TD

Sportspeople

DCU GAA
 Ireland international rules football team players

Senior inter-county footballers
 Dublin 

 Cavan
 Seanie Johnston
 John Tierney
 Cork
 Seán Óg Ó hAilpín
 Donegal
 Michael Boyle
 Michael Murphy
 Galway
 Tom Flynn
 Kildare
 Seanie Johnston
  Laois
 Colm Begley
 Ross Munnelly
 Louth
 Paddy Keenan
 Mayo
 Rob Hennelly
 Conor Mortimer
 Meath
  Anthony Moyles
 Roscommon
 Cathal Cregg
 David Keenan
 Donal Shine
 Sligo
 David Kelly

Senior inter-county ladies' footballers

 Mayo
 Sarah Rowe

Senior inter-county hurlers

Gaelic handballers
 Derek Henry
 Eoin Kennedy

men's rugby union internationals
 Tadhg Furlong 
 Jamie Heaslip
 Bernard Jackman
 Marty Moore
 Trevor Hogan

women's rugby union internationals
 Lindsay Peat

men's field hockey internationals
 Conor Harte
 David Harte

women's field hockey internationals
 Hannah Matthews
 Alison Meeke

Others
 Kevin Hunt, Bohemians captain
 Fionnuala McCormack, European cross country champion
 Ger McDonnell, reached the summit of Everest in May 2003
 Ciara Peelo, Olympic sailor, Beijing 2008
 Darren Sutherland, bronze medalist boxer, Beijing Olympic Games, 2008
 John Tierney, Ireland Australian rules football international
 Seán Óg Ó hAilpín, Ireland shinty–hurling international

Honorary degree holders (not otherwise listed)

 Amal Al Qubaisi
 Jocelyn Bell-Burnell
 Bill Clinton
 Brian Cody
 Wesley Cocker
 John Coolahan
 Mary Davis
 Susan Denham
 Nuala Ní Dhomhnaill
 Roddy Doyle
 John Fitzpatrick
 Olwen Fouéré
 Brian Friel
 David Hammond
 Charles Haughey
 Seamus Heaney
 John Hume
 Owen Keenan
 John E. Kelly III
 Sean Kelly
 Stanislaus Kennedy
 Dermot Lane
 Louis le Brocquy
 Pearse Lyons 
 Timothy Mahony
 Seamus Mallon
 James G. March
 Martin McAleese
 Mary McAleese
 Neil V McCann
 Margaret MacCurtain
 John McGahern
 Paid McGee
 Peter McVerry
 George J. Mitchell
 John Francis Mitchell
 Stephen Myers
 Martin Naughton
 Colm William O'Connell
 Brian O'Driscoll
 Brian O'Dwyer
 Labhrás Ó Murchú
 Sonia O'Sullivan
 John Pilger
 Paul Quigley
 Tomi Reichental
 Mary Robinson
 Tony Scott
 Jean Kennedy Smith
 Peter Sutherland
 Katie Taylor
 Mother Teresa
 Patrick A Toole
 David Trimble
 Willie Walsh
 Ernest Walton
 Maurice Whelan
 T. K. Whitaker
 Patrick J. Wright
 Muhammad Yunus

Members of DCU's Governing Authority and of the Board of the Educational Trust
 Dr. David Byrne Chancellor, 2006-2011
 Gay Byrne, past member, DCU Educational Trust
 Veronica Guerin, member of the governing body of DCU, 1982-1992
 Dr. Martin McAleese, Chancellor, 2011-

References

External links 
List of Honorary Members and Doctors of the University (2001)

 
Lists of people by university in the Republic of Ireland
Dublin (city)-related lists